Henrique Antonio (Henry) d'Assumpção  (born 1934) is an Australian electronic engineer, and was Chief Defence Scientist from 1987 to 1990.

d'Assumpção joined the Weapons Research Establishment (now known as Defence Science and Technology Group) in 1958 and took up work pioneered by Alan Butement on Barra sonobuoys and later Kariwara towed arrays. He worked his way up the organisation, culminating in the role of Chief Defence Scientist from 1987 to 1990. After leaving the Department of Defence, d'Assumpcao took up a role as professor at the University of South Australia and CEO of the Cooperative Research Centre for Sensor Signal and Information Processing until his retirement in 2000.

d'Assumpção was appointed an Officer of the Order of Australia in 1992 in recognition of his service to science and technology.

He won the 2003 M A Sargent Medal .

References

1934 births
Australian physicists
Chief Defence Scientists
Living people
Officers of the Order of Australia
Recipients of the M. A. Sargent Medal